William Rodney Allen is an American author and former Professor of English at the Louisiana School for Math, Science, and the Arts. He received his PhD from Duke University, and was a faculty member at LSMSA from the time the school first opened in 1983 until his retirement in 2011. He is married to Cindy Allen, a counselor at the school, and has two daughters, Emily and Claire, with her. He has many interests, which include and are not limited to playing guitar, reading, and cutting down Magnolia trees. He is also a Kurt Vonnegut fan and owns what is believed to be the last thing that Vonnegut wrote before his death in 2007, a postcard addressed to Allen.

Works
 Walker Percy: A Southern Wayfarer, University Press of Mississippi, 2006, 
 Conversations with Kurt Vonnegut (Literary conversations series) University Press of Mississippi, 1988, 
 Understanding Kurt Vonnegut (Understanding Contemporary American Literature) (1991)
 The Heath Introduction to Literature (1999)
 The Coen Brothers: Interviews Conversations with Filmmakers Series University Press of Mississippi, 2006,

References

Living people
Year of birth missing (living people)
American literary critics
American academics of English literature
Duke University alumni
American non-fiction writers